Gurubira is a genus of beetles in the family Cerambycidae, containing the following species:

 Gurubira apicalis (Fuchs, 1966)
 Gurubira atramentarius (White, 1855)
 Gurubira axillaris (Klug, 1825)
 Gurubira erythromos Napp & Marques, 1999
 Gurubira spectabilis (Martins & Napp, 1989)
 Gurubira tristis (Chevrolat, 1859)
 Gurubira violaceomaculatus (Gounelle, 1911)

References

Rhopalophorini